Minnedosa is a town in the southwestern part of the Canadian province of Manitoba situated 50 kilometres (32 mi) north of Brandon, Manitoba on the Little Saskatchewan River. The town's name means "flowing water" in the Dakota language. The population of Minnedosa reported in the 2021 Canadian Census was 2,741. The town is surrounded by the Rural Municipality of Minto – Odanah.

History
Prior to the arrival of Europeans in the area of Minnedosa, the land was primarily travelled and used by the nomadic Ojibway, Cree, Assiniboine, and Sioux peoples. John Tanner was the grandson of John Tanner who had been raised by a Odawa. He was an American settler who arrived in the area in 1869. The younger Tanner was the first Métis settler in the area and ran a ferry service across the Little Saskatchewan River. When a bridge was built in 1879, the ferry became obsolete and at the same time, a small town, Tanner's Crossing, was started nearby. John Armitage moved to the area around this time in 1877, and began to build a sawmill and gristmill. He joined together with Tanner to lay out a new town site and eventually Armitage had accumulated  of property. Tanner named the new town Minnedosa, from the Dakota word mní dúza meaning "flowing water".

Although Minnedosa once hoped to be a site of a river crossing for the Canadian Pacific Railway's transcontinental railway, the honour was initially given to Rapid City, while the actual site of the railway was later settled on a site much further south creating the city of Brandon. In 1883 Minnedosa was incorporated as a town, it had experienced a period of growth from settlement schemes put forth by the Canadian government. As Minnedosa became a town, this coincided with the actual arrival of the railway in 1883, bringing about more growth for the now quickly growing settlement.

A dam was proposed in 1907 and approved in December of the same year by the Government of Canada. It was built on the Little Saskatchewan River near the town. After several delays, the dam was completed in 1912, creating Minnedosa Lake. Water first flowed over the spillway on April 10, 1912. Minnedosa was the second community in the Province of Manitoba to generate its own hydroelectric power. An earlier project in 1900 was also on the Minnedosa River and supplied power to the town of Brandon, Manitoba. Initially privately owned, the generation plant was taken over by the Manitoba Power Commission in 1920 and replaced by a diesel generation plant and by 1930, power from the provincial grid. The lake was used as a source of water for the town, for recreation, and for supplying the engines of the Canadian Pacific Railway. On May 4, 1948, the spillway of the dam failed due to erosion of structure, and the resulting flood damaged many homes and businesses in the town. The spillway was not repaired until 1950 by the Prairie Farm Rehabilitation Administration.

Since 1981 the Minnedosa Ethanol Plant has been producing ethanol to be blended into gasoline, as of late 2007 it has been expanded into one of the largest ethanol facilities in Canada. This plant is owned and operated by Husky Energy.

Geography

Climate
Minnedosa has a humid continental climate (Köppen dfb) typical of southern Manitoba. As a result of its far inland position at a relatively high latitude, winters are extremely cold with a January mean of below . In the relatively short summers Minnedosa experiences warm and sometimes hot temperatures due to warmer continental air masses. It is prone to cold nights year-round, with every single month having recorded air frost.

Demographics 

Attractions

 Minnedosa Civic Center – The large clock tower located downtown
 Buffalo Park – located south of the Minnedosa Dam on PTH 262
 Train Park located on the east side of Main Street Minnedosa
 Nature Trail – 20 minute walk through wooded area adjacent to Buffalo Compound. Has a swinging bridge as well as a viewing tower
 Heritage Park – A complex containing several buildings relating to the history of Minnedosa and its surrounding area
 Lookout Tower – Approximately  tower on top of a steep hill. Overlooks entire valley
 Trout Pond – Fishing spot stocked with many trout. Located at Heritage Village
 Minnedosa is also the site of an annual event, called Rockin' the Fields of Minnedosa
 Minnedosa Paddling Club, part of Manitoba Paddling Association

Education
There is a high school called Minnedosa Collegiate Institute, often called M.C.I., and there is an elementary school called Tanner's Crossing School (T.C.S.). Both schools are part of the Rolling River School Division, which has its main bus dispatch and administration offices in town.

Media

Newspaper
 Minnedosa Tribune

Notable people
Izzy Asper, founder of CanWest Global Communications Corp
Ron Chipperfield, professional hockey player
Frances Gertrude McGill (1882–1959), forensic pathologist and criminologist
Maxine Miller, actress
Isabela Onyshko, 2016 Olympic gymnast
Kyle Parrott, 2010 Olympic speed skater
Colin Pearson, Baron Pearson, British law lord
Kate Rice, prospector, adventurer and writer died here
Curt Ridley, professional hockey player
Ken Watson, 3-time Brier-winning curler

References

External links

Towns in Manitoba
Dakota toponyms